Klára Zakopalová was the defending champion but chose not to participate. 
Pauline Parmentier defeated Irina-Camelia Begu in the final 6–3, 6–2.

Seeds

Main draw

Finals

Top half

Bottom half

References
 Main Draw
 Qualifying Draw

Open GDF Suez de Marseille - Singles